Ronald Mason (8 September 1926 – 16 January 1997) was a director and producer of drama for the BBC, a BBC executive in his native Northern Ireland at the height of the Troubles, the Head of BBC Radio Drama as successor to Martin Esslin and was active in the European Broadcasting Union (EBU).

Known universally throughout Irish and British theatrical and broadcasting circles as Ronnie, among the writers Mason championed, Brian Friel perhaps became the most prominent. Mason produced and directed Friel's earliest plays, A Sort of Freedom (16 January 1958) and To This Hard House (24 April 1958), for the BBC Northern Ireland Home Service on radio and later brought Friel's stage work to the BBC's national networks.

Life and works
Ronald Charles Frederick Mason was born in Ballymena, County Antrim, the seventh child of a seventh child in a strongly Protestant community. Among his schoolmates in Ballymena was Ian Paisley, who was to become a major political figure in Unionist politics and a leading anti-Catholic, whom he was later to command to ‘Sit down, Ian’, when the Reverend Paisley began a peroration at the BBC during Mason's years as the BBC's Head of Programmes in Northern Ireland. The Reverend Paisley complied. Mason graduated from Queen's University, Belfast, and began his career teaching English and French in the 1940s. He joined the BBC six years later in 1955 as a radio producer in Belfast, finding a kindred spirit in the novelist, radio producer and broadcaster Sam Hanna Bell against BBC Belfast's prevailing caution in political matters, standing with Bell as an advocate for the shipyard worker turned controversial playwright, Sam Thompson.

After negotiating the treacherous BBC politics in Northern Ireland, successfully bringing new and established writers to the Northern Ireland Home Service and attracting attention in London, he joined BBC Radio Drama in London in 1963. As his successor as Head of Radio Drama, John Tydeman, described it in his obituary in The Independent, "he became executive producer of an innovative new series of 15-minute-long single plays broadcast every weekday evening at 11.45 under the title Just Before Midnight. The series gave great encouragement to new playwrights, including the young Tom Stoppard". Jill Hyem and Brian Friel would be among the other emerging playwrights.

His time in London also saw him producing and directing a twenty-hour-long production of Tolstoy's  War and Peace , bringing plays by Friel to national prominence and directing work from Eugene O'Neill, Marguerite Duras and Christopher Hampton. During forays into television in the 1960s, he produced The Randy Dandy, by Stewart Love, ‘the Irish John Osborne’, and was director for the six-part series Here Lies Miss Sabry>, starring Sebastian Shaw, produced by Dennis Vance and written by Raymond Bowers. He also oversaw a series of new plays called Double Image, among which he produced Tom Stoppard's British television debut, A Separate Peace in 1966 . His radio production of Friel's play The Loves of Cass McGuire in August 1969 preceded the Broadway premiere by two months and the Dublin premiere at the Abbey Theatre the following year.

Head of Programmes, Northern Ireland (1970–1976)
His political acumen seemingly took him away from drama in 1970, when he returned to Belfast to assume the role of Head of Programmes, Northern Ireland. It was not a simple role of choosing programmes, but an essential and central role in redefining the BBC's presence in the province. Security was a continuing issue, bringing staff into safer buildings in the midst of a bombing campaign, and balancing the complicated demands of Protestant and Catholic communities.

Although Mason's time at Belfast's Broadcasting House saw him facing serious civil unrest, shown through the bomb attacks on the BBC, the violence had impact through all the province's cultural life, reducing audiences and seeing the closure of theatres. Mason was made vice-chairman of the Interplay Theatre Management Committee of the Arts Council of Northern Ireland, set up to form a company that would offer work to the ‘actors and actresses’, suffering unemployment in traditional theatres, by taking plays to schools. The work ranged from classical drama to Bernard Shaw's Arms and the Man, but also quickly added the living writer Stewart Love, whose work Mason had previously produced for the BBC.

Quoting from BBC files, John Tydeman, in his Independent obituary, presented Mason's response to a suggestion in 1972 from the BBC Director General, Charles Curran, that he might like some respite from the strain of the Troubles: "My duty is to Ireland. I intend to devote myself to the job of helping to make the province a better place in which to live." He continued to accept his responsibilities for another four years, including his leading role in the launch of BBC Radio Ulster in 1975. Tydeman described him as "a man of all Ireland".

Head of Radio Drama (1976–1986)
On the back of his success in Northern Ireland, Mason was one of five people who might have become Controller of BBC Radio 4 in 1976 along with Monica Sims and David Hatch, both of whom were appointed some years later. In 1976, however, the post was given to Ian McIntyre, whose strict journalistic regime lasted only two years before he was moved to become Controller of Radio 3. In the meantime, Mason was invited back to London to take up the post of Head of Radio Drama on the impending departure of Martin Esslin, and became the third longest-serving head of one of the most culturally significant posts of the time. His entanglements with Ian McIntyre, however, were to last the rest of his time in radio.

One of the reasons for bringing Mason back to Radio Drama, above his proven success in the form, was the need for a politically savvy executive who could fight the corner for Radio Drama at one of the cyclical period of BBC cuts in funding. He did this with considerable success, and was held up as a model by European broadcasters also facing contractions in the relatively expensive form of radio art. Not everything was considered a success by Mason. In 1980, Radio Drama's most popular programme, the Radio Two daily soap, Waggoner's Walk (on air since 1969), was presented as a potential cut since its budget was almost exactly the requested savings. Although Mason also presented a fully costed alternative series of cuts across the drama output, BBC management opted for the simple expedient of axing the soap.

Meanwhile, Ian McIntyre's reign at Radio 3, with limited journalism in the musical output, saw McIntyre's intensive scrutiny of the spoken-word programmes. Drama became a particular target. When McIntyre blocked the broadcast of a Mason-commissioned radio drama by the writer and director Mike Leigh in May, 1979, Too Much of a Good Thing, recorded on location with convincing sexual activity, it set up a continuing conflict. Piers Plowright, in the book And Now on Radio 4 by Simon Elmes, recalled the occasion when Mason's fury at a Radio 3 meeting, in response to criticism of a radio play, led to Mason throwing a chair and leaving the meeting. Mike Leigh's play was not broadcast until 1992 some years after the departures of both Mason and McIntyre from their posts,

Mason continued to support his writers and his personal intervention in defending a Howard Barker script, Scenes from an Execution, which meant a line-by-line scrutiny of the play with negotiations that went down to the use of the word "groin". Richard Wortley's production, broadcast on Radio 3, features Glenda Jackson in the leading role. Despite his reservations, McIntyre nominated the production for Europe's grand prize for radio drama, the Prix Italia, which it won in 1985.

Mason's service on committees from the EBU, the Arts Council of Northern Ireland and the National Council for Drama Training was influential and rigorous. At the NCDT his support for removing the accreditation of a leading London drama college in the 1980s had positive effects for the NCDT, which was shown to be far from toothless, and for the college in question which improved impressively. His concern for drama training reflected his continuing support for BBC Radio Drama's annual award of contracts to graduating drama college students competing in the Carleton Hobbs Awards, named after one of British radio's most successful radio actors.

The tenacity of Mason's tenure secured radio drama as a key component in the Corporation's public service commitments. His interventions preserved the bulk of the radio drama output, and its continuing integration with radio features, which, particularly in the work of Piers Plowright, brought European recognition to the department in several Prix Italia awards.

Later life
After his retirement, he returned to radio to produce John Arden and Margaretta D'Arcy's Whose is the Kingdom?, a nine-play sequence of dramas about Christianity. Arden and D’Arcy wrote to The Irish Times after Mason's death, reporting that his funeral had needed to be postponed by a week to accommodate the people who wished to attend, and, in their tribute, gave an insight into his working practices: ‘As a drama director, he was a natural radio genius and an educator both to playwrights and actors. He never seemed to forget that he had begun his adult life as a teacher: he would inspire his casts by getting up from the directorial chair, moving all over the studio, telling stories, and more or less improvising the whole play from start to finish, with a running fire, of folklorish anecdotes from his childhood in County Antrim.’ 

In his last years, Mason suffered from emphysema, related to his devotion to cigarettes, but even then, as Oscar Wilde's grandson, Merlin Holland, wrote to  The Independent, Mason called in his estimable contacts to secure Wilde's place in Poet's Corner at Westminster Abbey when he realised that a "fellow Irishman" had been denied his rightful place. "Without Ronald Mason's taking the initiative, despite his ill-health, Wilde might still be waiting" wrote Merlin Holland. "The ceremony on 14 February 1995 drew the biggest Poets' Corner crowd since Byron's inclusion in the 1960s".

Mason died of emphysema, still smoking next to his oxygen tank, in London on 16 January 1997. He was 70 years old.

Radio plays

References 

BBC executives
1926 births
1997 deaths
BBC radio producers
British radio producers
People from Ballymena
People from County Antrim
Alumni of Queen's University Belfast
People of The Troubles (Northern Ireland)